N4 is an Icelandic media company and a television channel. With its headquarters located in Akureyri, it is the only Icelandic television channel located outside the capital region. It was founded in 2006 with the merger of Samver, Extra dagskráin, Smit auglýsingagerð and Traustmynd.

Samver had previously run the television station Aksjón. Aside from operating the TV station, N4 has a website, profiles on several social media outlets (Facebook, YouTube, Instagram, Twitter, TikTok), a podcast and a bi-weekly newspaper as well as offering help with publishing and creating production projects.

References

External links
 Official website

Television channels and stations established in 2006
Television channels in Iceland